The following radio stations broadcast on AM frequency 1350 kHz: 1350 AM is a Regional broadcast frequency.

Argentina
 LRJ747 in Cordoba
LS6 in Buenos Aires

Canada

Italy
 I AM Radio in Milano area

Mexico
 XECTZ-AM in Cuetzalan, Puebla
 XELBL-AM in San Luis Rio Colorado, Sonora
 XEQK-AM in Mexico City
 XETB-AM in Gómez Palacio, Durango
 XEZD-AM in Cd. Camargo, Tamaulipas

Panama
HOZ38 at Panama

Philippines
 DZXQ in Manila

United Kingdom

United States

References

Lists of radio stations by frequency